John Berry may refer to:

Entertainment
 John Berry (film director) (1917–1999), American film director
 John Berry (illustrator) (1920–2009), British illustrator
 John Berry (country singer) (born 1959), American country singer
 John Berry (album), debut album
 John Berry (arts administrator) (born 1961), British musician and arts administrator
 John Berry (Beastie Boys) (1963–2016), member of the Beastie Boys

Politics
 John Berry (administrator) (born 1959), director of the U.S. Office of Personnel Management (2009–2013), Ambassador to Australia
 John Berry (congressman) (1833–1879), U.S. Representative
 John Berry (New Jersey governor) (1619–1712), Deputy Governor of New Jersey
 John M. Berry (1827–1887), American jurist and politician
 John Walter Berry (1868–1943), Canadian politician
 John Wesley Berry (1858–1931), Tacoma councilman

Sports
 Jonathan Berry (born 1953), chess master
 Jack Berry (hurling) (1944–2003), Irish sportsperson
 John Berry (cricketer) (1823–1895), British cricketer
 John Berry (rugby) (1866–1930), rugby union footballer
 John Berry (speedway promoter) (1944–2012), British speedway promoter and England national team manager
 Johnny Berry (1926–1994), Manchester United and England footballer
 John Berry (footballer, born 1880) (1880–1954), English footballer
 John Paul Berry, American baseball pitcher and first baseman

Other
 John Berry (Royal Navy officer) (1635–1689/90), British naval officer involved in the settlement of Newfoundland
 John Cutting Berry (1847–1936), American medical missionary to Japan
 John Berry (priest) (1849–1923), Church of England priest and Royal Navy chaplain
 John Berry (zoologist) (1907–2002), Scottish zoologist and ecologist
 John N. Berry (1933–2020), American librarian
 John W. Berry (librarian) (born 1947), American librarian
 John W. Berry (psychologist), Canadian psychologist
 John Stevens Berry, attorney

See also
 John Barry (disambiguation)
 John Bury (disambiguation)
 John Fraser de Berry, Quebec lawyer and politician